Paxton Media Group of Paducah, Kentucky, is a privately held media company with holdings that include newspapers and a TV station, WPSD-TV in Paducah. David M. Paxton is president and CEO.

The company owns 32 daily newspapers and numerous weekly newspapers, mostly in the southern United States. Daily circulation totals 350,000. Holdings include The Paducah Sun, the High Point Enterprise in High Point, North Carolina, the Jonesboro Sun in Jonesboro, Arkansas, and the Daily Star in Hammond, Louisiana and The Daily Citizen in Searcy, Arkansas.

History
Paxton Media Group traces it roots to 1896, when a group of investors headed by William F. Paxton launched The Evening Sun by buying the assets of the failing Paducah Standard at 214 Broadway. The cost was $8,900, and the men started with $10,000 capital.  The newspaper did not make a profit until 1918. In 1929, Paxton's son, Edwin J. Paxton, who had taken over as editor, bought out the rival News-Democrat.  After the merger, the newspaper became The Sun-Democrat, and operations were moved to the current location at 408 Kentucky Avenue in 1934.  The name changed to The Paducah Sun in 1978 at the request of Jack Paxton, editor at the time and  grandson of Edwin J. Paxton.

At 4:20 p.m. May 28, 1957, WPSD television, (the PSD stands for Paducah Sun-Democrat) went on the air as the company-owned television station based in Paducah. It is an NBC affiliate.

The company operated only The Paducah Sun and WPSD-TV until 1989, when it began acquiring other newspapers.

In 1998, the company purchased Nixon Newspapers Inc which included the Wabash Plain Dealer, located in Wabash, Indiana.

In December 2004, Paxton Media Group purchased The Herald-Sun in Durham, North Carolina. At the time of the purchase Paxton Media Group already owned 7 other newspapers in North Carolina. Durham, N.C., is home to Duke University. In 2003, The Herald-Sun drew criticism during the Duke Lacrosse false rape accusation scandal. In late December 2016, Paxton sold The Herald-Sun to The McClatchy Company.

In 2007, Paxton Media Group purchased three Indiana newspapers: the Marion Chronicle-Tribune (in July) from the Gannett Foundation; the Huntington Herald-Press (in May) from the Quayle family; and the LaPorte County Herald-Argus from Small Newspaper Group (in September).

Paxton purchased the Mayfield Messenger in Kentucky in June 2015. In May 2016, Paxton purchased The Elkhart Truth in Indiana.

In 2017, Paxton acquired the Grayson County News Gazette, the News Democrat Leader, and the Macon County Times from Civitas Media. In January 2018, Paxton purchased the Daily Herald in Roanoke Rapids, North Carolina, from Wick Communications. In June 2018, it purchased The Batesville Daily Guard in Arkansas from the Jones family. In November 2018, Paxton purchased the Kentucky New Era. In May 2019, it purchased The Rochester Sentinel in Indiana. By June 2019, Paxton acquired four additional Arkansas newspapers, including Conway's Log Cabin Democrat, Clinton's Van Buren County Democrat, The Sun-Times in Heber Springs, and the Newport Independent.

In July 2020, Paxton purchased the Dubois County Herald in Jasper, Indiana. In October 2020, Paxton purchased the Wilkes Journal-Patriot in North Carolina. In May 2021, Paxton purchased Landmark Community Newspapers, publisher of 47 daily and weekly newspapers in Florida, Indiana, Iowa, Kentucky, New Mexico, North Carolina, Ohio, South Carolina and Virginia. It later resold some publications acquired in the Landmark purchase that it considered outside the company's footprint: The Las Vegas Optic in New Mexico to O'Rourke Media Group; Huskers Illustrated to Nicholas Holdings; and two newspapers in Iowa, the Red Oak Express and the Glenwood Opinion-Tribune, to J. Louis Mullen.

In November 2022 Paxton acquired six North Carolina newspapers from Gannett Co., Inc. The additions include the Lexington Dispatch, the Asheboro Courier-Tribune, the Burlington Times-News, the Kinston Free Press, the New Bern Sun Journal, and The Daily News of Jacksonville.

Business practices

Durham Herald-Sun

Paxton Media Group was criticized when it fired nearly 25 percent of the employees of The Herald-Sun, many of them longtime staples of the newsroom, the day it assumed ownership. Paxton defended the move by claiming that the newsroom was overstaffed and the salaries were causing the Durham, North Carolina paper to post annual losses. According to the Durham-based Independent Weekly, sources familiar with the Herald-Sun, Co.'s accounting ledgers, the company was operating profitably at least 6 months prior to Paxton's $124 million purchase.

Allegations of lackluster and biased reporting by Paxton Media Group's holdings became news, again, with the dismissal of charges against the suspects in the Duke lacrosse rape case, when it became clear that The Herald-Sun editorial policy would not permit the paper to publish criticism of Durham district attorney Mike Nifong, despite the fact that Nifong was facing ethics charges by the North Carolina State Bar and demands by the North Carolina Conference of District Attorneys that Nifong remove himself from the case.
In December 2016, Paxton Media sold The Herald-Sun to The McClatchy Company, owner of a competitor newspaper, The News & Observer of Raleigh, North Carolina.

La Porte Herald-Argus
In September 2007, Paxton purchased the Herald-Argus of La Porte, Indiana amidst rumors that the paper would either be moved, merged, or have its staff severely cut, due to the recent acquisition of a number of rural newspapers in northern Indiana. In order to allay those rumors, then-publisher John A. Newby wrote a column that firmly stated that the Herald-Argus was profitable and "lean" and therefore would not see any dramatic changes.  Despite published claims to the contrary, in October, shortly after taking over operation of the paper, Paxton Media laid-off about half its staff at the Herald-Argus and moved its production location to that of the Paxton-owned Herald-Palladium in St. Joseph, Michigan, which by Paxton's own admission, has negatively impacted the paper's ability to publish timely local news.  Reminiscent of the abrupt manner in which the Herald-Sun firings were conducted, at least one longtime Herald-Argus staffer was notified of her termination via certified mail while she recovered from surgery at home. The remaining Herald-Argus staffers and the staffers at other nearby Paxton-owned papers were specifically instructed not to publish information regarding the Herald-Argus staff cuts and production changes. The Herald-Argus''' website has also removed the September 17, 2007 column which promised that there would be no staff cuts or relocation of the paper's offices under Paxton's watch.

In July 2008, Paxton consolidated operations even more, making the publisher, managing editor, and other editorial management the same for both papers.

High Point Enterprise
On November 15, 2007, reports indicate that Paxton dramatically cut the staff of the High Point Enterprise in High Point, North Carolina, which Paxton took control of in 2004.  This is the third round of layoffs since 1999, when Paxton first purchased a stake in the paper. Senior Enterprise staff frequently criticized Paxton's management of the paper, arguing that there was a quantifiable reduction in local coverage.

Properties

Newspapers

Daily
 The Batesville Daily Guard - Batesville, Arkansas
 The Chapel Hill Herald - Durham, North Carolina
 The Courier - Russellville, Arkansas
 The Daily Citizen - Searcy, Arkansas
 The Jonesboro Sun - Jonesboro, Arkansas
 Paragould Daily Press - Paragould, Arkansas
 Douglas County Sentinel - Douglasville, Georgia
 Griffin Daily News - Griffin, Georgia
 Times-Georgian - Carrollton, Georgia
 Connersville News-Examiner - Connersville, Indiana
 The Courier-Times - New Castle, Indiana
 The News-Dispatch - Michigan City, Indiana
 Peru Tribune - Peru, Indiana
 Princeton Daily Clarion - Princeton, Indiana
 The Rochester Sentinel - Rochester, Indiana
 The Shelbyville News - Shelbyville, Indiana
 The Times - Frankfort, Indiana
 Vincennes Sun-Commercial - Vincennes, Indiana
 Wabash Plain Dealer - Wabash, Indiana
 The Chronicle-Tribune - Marion, Indiana
 Huntington Herald-Press - Huntington, Indiana
 LaPorte County Herald-Argus - LaPorte County, Indiana
 The Elkhart Truth - Elkhart, Indiana
 The News-Enterprise - Elizabethtown, Kentucky
 Kentucky New Era - Hopkinsville, Kentucky
 The Messenger - Madisonville, Kentucky
 Mayfield Messenger - Mayfield, Kentucky
 Messenger-Inquirer - Owensboro, Kentucky
 The Paducah Sun - Paducah, Kentucky
 Daily Star - Hammond, Louisiana
 The Herald-Palladium - St. Joseph, Michigan
 Daily Corinthian - Corinth, Mississippi
 The Daily Courier - Forest City, North Carolina
 The Goldsboro News-Argus- Goldsboro, North Carolina
 The Daily Dispatch - Henderson, North Carolina
 High Point Enterprise - High Point, North Carolina
 News-Topic - Lenoir, North CarolinaThe Enquirer-Journal - Monroe, North CarolinaThe Daily Herald - Roanoke Rapids, North Carolina
 The Sanford Herald - Sanford, North Carolina
 The Mountain Press - Sevierville, Tennessee
 Log Cabin Democrat - Conway, Arkansas
 The Grand Haven Tribune - Grand Haven, Michigan 
 The Lebanon Democrat - Lebanon, Tennessee {https://www.clevelandbanner.com/  The Cleveland Daily Banner - Cleveland, Tennessee]WeeklyList is incomplete- 
 Van Buren County Democrat - Clinton, Arkansas
 The Sun-Times - Heber Springs, Arkansas
 Newport Independent - Newport, Arkansas
 The Haralson Gateway-Beacon - Bremen, Georgia
 The Tallapoosa Journal - Tallapoosa, Georgia
 The Villa-Rican - Villa Rica, Georgia
 Mount Carmel Register - Mount Carmel, Illinois
 The Metropolis Planet - Metropolis, Illinois
 The Standard - Boonville, Indiana
 Marshall County Tribune-Courier - Benton, Kentucky
 The Cadiz Record - Trigg County, Kentucky
 McLean County News - Calhoun, Kentucky
 Franklin Favorite - Franklin, Kentucky
 Herald-Ledger - Eddyville, Kentucky
 Progress - Dawson Springs, Kentucky
 Journal Enterprise - Providence, Kentucky
 Grayson County News Gazette - Leitchfield, Kentucky
 News Democrat Leader - Russellville, Kentucky
 The South Haven Tribune - South Haven, Michigan
 Archdale-Trinity News - Archdale, North Carolina
 Indian Trail Trader - Indian Trail, North Carolina
 News-Topic - Lenoir, North Carolina
 Wilkes Journal-Patriot - North Wilkesboro, North Carolina
 Thomasville Times - Thomasville, North Carolina
 Waxhaw Exchange - Waxhaw, North Carolina
 Macon County Times - Lafayette, Tennessee
 Portland Leader - Portland, Tennessee
 The Lebanon Enterprise - [Lebanon, Kentucky]
 The Corydon Democrat - Corydon, Indiana
 Clarion News - Corydon, Indiana
 The Pioneer News - [Shepherdsville, Kentucky]
 The Kentucky Standard - [Bardstown, Kentucky]
 The Springfield Sun - [Springfield, Kentucky]
 The Central Kentucky News-Journal - [Campbellsville, Kentucky]

Other
 WPSD-TV - Paducah, Kentucky
 Sun Publishing - Paducah, Kentucky
 WFKN - Franklin, Kentucky
 Corydon Instant Print - Corydon, Indiana

References
 
 
  - Mayoral candidate alleges discrimination by the La Porte Herald Argus in an online blog posted by the Michigan City News Dispatch'', another Paxton Media Group paper.
  - List of Paxton Media Group's daily newspapers
 
 

Mass media companies of the United States
Newspaper companies of the United States
Companies based in Kentucky
Paducah, Kentucky
Publishing companies established in 1896
1896 establishments in Kentucky